"1, 2, Miss You" is a song by Belgian singer and songwriter Blanche. It was released as a digital download on 8 May 2020 by PIAS Belgium as the third single from her debut studio album Empire. The song was written by Ellie Delvaux, Jessica Sharman and Rich Cooper.

Critical reception
Jonathan Vautrey of Wiwibloggs said, "It's a mid-tempo alternative-pop track that balances light and dark elements to create an almost ethereal atmosphere."

Charts

Release history

Notes

References

2020 songs
2020 singles
Blanche (singer) songs
Songs written by Blanche (singer)